Les Îlets-Jérémie is a settlement in the municipality of Colombier in the Côte-Nord region of the Canadian province of Quebec. Located on the north shore of the Saint Lawrence River, the small community is named after the Jérémie Islets that are just off its shores and mark the western end of the Jérémie Islets Bay (French: baie des Îlets-Jérémie). The Innu call the hamlet Ishkuamishkut, meaning "where one expects polar bear".

The islets were named in turn after a certain Noël Jérémie, or Lamontagne, who was born between 1629 and 1638, and died between 1694 and 1697. Around 1660, he established a trading and fishing company. In 1673, the first reference was made to the Îlets-Jérémie Post (later on also written as Îlets-à-Jérémie or Îlets-de-Jérémie) by François de Crespieul. That year, Noël Jérémie was a clerk at the Tadoussac post, but he often went to the islands with his son Nicolas to conduct fur trade with the Innu of Betsiamites and vicinity. Nicolas became an interpreter and clerk of the Hudson's Bay Company, and wrote the famous Relation du Détroit de la Baie d'Hudson, published in 1720. He died at Quebec City in 1732. After periodic closures, the post became the property of the Hudson's Bay Company in 1831, and was considered as the best trading post on the North Shore. It closed permanently in 1859 and operations were transferred to Betsiamites.

The community on the mainland has existed at least since 1735 when the Saint Anne chapel was first built. French Jesuit Jean-Baptiste de la Brosse (1724–1782) taught the local Innu reading and writing skills in their own language. Consequently, the Innu of Les Îlets-Jérémie adopted the Latin script and exhibited an unexpected degree of literacy in the 18th century.

Notable people from Les Îlets-Jérémie
Napoléon-Alexandre Comeau, naturalist, was born there in 1846.

References

External links
 Municipalité de Colombier

Communities in Côte-Nord
Ilets-Jeremie